Leslie Green (February 8, 1914 – March 2, 1985), nicknamed "Chin", was an American Negro league outfielder from 1939 to 1946.

A native of St. Louis, Missouri, Green attended Sumner High School. He made his Negro leagues debut in 1939 for the St. Louis–New Orleans Stars, and represented the Stars in the 1940 East–West All-Star Game. Green died in St. Louis in 1985 at age 71.

References

External links
 and Seamheads

1914 births
1985 deaths
Memphis Red Sox players
St. Louis–New Orleans Stars players
New York Black Yankees players
Baseball outfielders
Baseball players from St. Louis
St. Louis Stars (1939) players
20th-century African-American sportspeople